Club Balonmano Elche, also known as Elche Mustang for sponsorship reasons, is a women's handball club from Elche in Spain. CB Elche competes in the División de Honor, the top tier in the Spanish league system.

CB Elche was 2nd in the 2012–13 season.

Season to season

Team

Current squad 
Squad for the 2020-2021 season

Goalkeepers
 12  Nicole Morales
   Patricia Encinas
   Andrea Giner
Wingers
RW
   Giselle Menendez
 33  Clara Gascó 
LW 
   Celia Guilabert
   Joana Bolling
Line Players 
 3  Ekaterina Zhukova
 24  Lysa Tchaptchet

Back players
LB
 11  Ivet Musons
   Gracia Duque
   Angela Rodriguez 
CB
 8  Patricia Méndez
 44  Ana Martínez
   Carolina Bono
RB
 14  María Flores Adsuara
   Nuria Andreu

Transfers
Transfers for the 2020-2021

 Joining
  Joana Bolling (LW) (from  Aula Alimentos de Valladolid)  Giselle Menéndez (RW) (from  Balonmano Bolaños de Ciudad Real)  Carolina Bono (CB) (from  Balonmano Bolaños de Ciudad Real)  Gracia Duque (LB) (from  Balonmano Bolaños de Ciudad Real) Leaving
  Jennifer Gutiérrez (LW) (to  Borussia Dortmund Handball)  Laura Hernández (LB) (to  BM Bera Bera)  María Asunción Sánchez (GK) (to  BM Salud Tenerife)''

Notable players 

  Vanesa Amorós
  Ana Paula Belo
  Mihaela Ciobanu
  Lara González Ortega
  Chana Masson
  Marizza Faría
  África Sempere
  Marieke van der Wal

References

External links
 Official website

Spanish handball clubs
Sports teams in the Valencian Community
Handball clubs established in 1958
1958 establishments in Spain
Sport in Elche